SM-58 could refer to:

 2B1 Oka self-propelled gun
 Shure SM58 microphone